Juan Manuel González Corominas (born May 24, 1968 in Navàs, Barcelona), also known as Pedregá, is a Spanish off-road motorbike and ATV driver.

He started racing on enduro categories in 1988. In 2001, he started to race on off-road quad races.

He has competed in the Dakar Rally, driving a quad, since 2005, being able to lead the general classification and win several stages. He won the 2006 Dakar Rally in quads category.

Honors

 1996 Enduro Spanish Championship
 2001 Quads Spanish Championship
 2002 Baja Aragón
 2006 Dakar Rally

External links
 

1968 births
Living people
Dakar Rally drivers
Spanish rally drivers
Off-road racing drivers
Off-road motorcycle racers

Dakar Rally co-drivers